Hans Ulrich "Uli" Aschenborn (born 6 September 1947 in Johannesburg, South Africa) is a Southern African animal painter. The musea in Windhoek and Swakopmund (Namibia) have artwork of Uli as well as the National Art Gallery of Namibia.

Work
The Namibian media branded Uli Aschenborn's new style Amazing Changing Art, because his new creations change – be it by themselves (video b) or because the viewer changes his position - or the painting is moved (videos a, c - i). For his chameleon-paintings, which change color and content if the angle of view is changed, he only needs sand and paint on his canvas. The changing shadow of Aschenborn's turning sculptures show metamorphoses, e.g. the aging of a boy to an old man eventually to a skeleton (video b). The images within his Morph-Cubes (video i) distort in a grotesque way while the onlooker moves. Because movement is an integral part of these art works they are Kinetic Art.

Uli's paintings are inspired by not only his roots in Namibia, but by European liveliness complemented by landscapes (video e and photo k) - also by abstract art.

The “Ensad Alumni Paris”, of the “l'Association des anciens élèves de l'École nationale supérieure des arts décoratifs” (i. e. the Alumni Association of the National School of Decorative Arts in Paris) has appointed Uli Aschenborn honorary member in 2018.

Exhibitions
Uli Aschenborn had more than 60 exhibitions since 2009.

Solo exhibitions (selection)

 1993 "Africa & Computer Art" Gallery Artelier Windhoek (Namibia)
 1999 "Africa Port Andrat’s" (Mallorca)
 2003 "Sculpture-Morphs", Gallery Hexagone, Aachen (Germany)
 2005 Exhibition "Morphs" simultaneously in the two Galleries FAH and HAF in Maastricht (Netherlands)
 2006 "Morphs" National Art Gallery of Namibia in Windhoek (Namibia)
 2007 Aschenborn – Retrospective Kendzia Gallery, Windhoek (Namibia)
 2007 Retrospective in the Hexagone Gallery Aachen (Germany)
 2008 "Africa" Kendzia Gallery, Windhoek (Namibia)
 2008 "Changing Art and more", Steinweg Gallery, Stolberg (Germany)
 2009 "Out of Africa" - Uli Aschenborn – Malmedé Gallery, Cologne (Germany)
 2009 Africa - Uli Aschenborn - Artedomus, Paris (France)
 2009 + 2013 "Chameleon Art", Museum Zinkhütte, Stolberg (Germany)
 2009 + 2010 "Africa", Gallery Kendzia, Windhoek (Namibia)
 2010 "In the South of Africa" - Uli Aschenborn, Artedomus Paris (France)
 2010 "Uli Aschenborn - African Wildlife", Zoo Berlin (Germany)
 2011 "Aschenborn's African Animals", BBK-Gallery, Aachen (Germany)
 2011 "Uli Aschenborn", Düsternbrook, Namibia
 2011 - 2012 "Uli Aschenborn", Schenckswerder, Namibia
 2012 "Chameleon Art", Gallery Hexagone Aachen (Germany)
 2013 "Chameleon Art", Tierheim Aachen (Germany)
 2015 "Changing Art", Art Hotel Superior Aachen (Germany)
 2017 "Amazing Changing Art", Barmuseo Suermondt-Ludwig-Museum Aachen (Germany)

Artwork

References

20th-century German painters
20th-century German male artists
German male painters
21st-century German painters
21st-century German male artists
Animal artists
1947 births
People from Johannesburg
Namibian painters
White Namibian people
White South African people
South African people of German descent
Namibian people of German descent
Living people
Articles containing video clips